Rougemont School (Welsh: Ysgol Rougemont) is an independent co-educational day school located in the manor house Llantarnam Hall in south Wales.  The school offers education for three to eighteen year-olds.

The current headmaster is Robert Carnevale, previously academic deputy head of the senior school, who succeeded Dr John Tribbick on his retirement in 2014. Ian Brown was headmaster from 1995 to 2002, and was succeeded by Dr Tribbick.

History
The school was founded in 1924 and housed in a building known as Rougemont House on Clevedon Road, Newport. The school expanded into the adjacent house in 1931 under the ownership of the Evans family. By 1946, the school was housed in Nant Coch House, Risca Road, Newport, and the number of pupils increased to approximately 200.

When the Evans' retired in 1974, a number of families raised a loan to buy the school, electing a board of nine governors. The Stow Hill buildings, formerly housing the Convent of St Joseph were purchased, and provision was extended first to Common Entrance level, then to O-levels and finally the first A-levels were taken in 1983 under the leadership of Frank Edwards. The site at Nant Coch was retained as a pre-preparatory department.

Succeeding years saw two changes of leadership, namely headmasters Richard Ham (1988–1991) and Graham Sims (1991–1995). Ham's tenure as headmaster was cut short by his sudden death in 1991 as a result of sepsis.

The former premises were sold to developers and are now occupied by a new housing estate. The building that currently houses the infant school is named for Nant Coch.

Fees
The termly fees for attending Rougemont range between £2,333 and £4,359 depending on the pupil's age. New pupils are interviewed by the headmaster and senior teachers; they are also required to sit examinations to determine their academic aptitude.

Notable former pupils
William Bragg, cricketer
Matt Tebbutt, chef and television food presenter
Richard Parks, Welsh international rugby union player
Banita Sandhu, Bollywood actress

External links 
School website

References 

Private schools in Torfaen
Member schools of the Headmasters' and Headmistresses' Conference
Educational institutions established in 1920
1920 establishments in Wales